Transcription factor jun-B is a protein that in humans is encoded by the JUNB gene. Transcription factor jun-B is a transcription factor involved in regulating gene activity following the primary growth factor response. It binds to the DNA sequence 5'-TGA[CG]TCA-3'.

Interactions
JUNB has been shown to interact with
 BRCA1, and
 SMAD3.

See also
 AP-1 (transcription factor)

References

Further reading

External links 
 

Transcription factors